Ringsaker Church is a parish church of the Church of Norway in Ringsaker Municipality in Innlandet county, Norway. It is located in the village of Moelv. It is the church for the Ringsaker parish which is part of the Ringsaker prosti (deanery) in the Diocese of Hamar. The white, stone church was built in a cruciform design around the year 1150 using plans drawn up by an unknown architect. The church seats about 300 people.

History
The church in Ringsaker was built in the 12th century, possibly around the year 1150 or a little earlier. The Romanesque stone church originally had a long church design with a small choir and a large tower above the centre of the nave (the tower did not have a tall spire, however). In the late 1200s, the church was expanded and given a lot of Gothic features. The choir was enlarged to the east and the nave was expanded by adding transept wings to the north and south, creating a cruciform floor plan. Interestingly, the north wing is longer than the south wing. A large sacristy was built on the north side of the choir. In 1594, a man named Matz Tårnbygger built a spire on top of the stone tower. In 1652, Werner Olsen, the famous builder, constructed a new tower and spire. On 22 September 1669, the tower blew down in a storm.

In 1814, this church served as an election church. Together with more than 300 other parish churches across Norway, it was a polling station for elections to the 1814 Norwegian Constituent Assembly which wrote the Constitution of Norway. This was Norway's first national elections. Each church parish was a constituency that elected people called "electors" who later met together in each county to elect the representatives for the assembly that was to meet in Eidsvoll later that year.

Media gallery

See also
List of churches in Hamar

References

Churches in Ringsaker
Churches in Innlandet
Cruciform churches in Norway
Stone churches in Norway
12th-century churches in Norway
12th-century establishments in Norway
Norwegian election church